Hipgnosis Songs Fund is a British Guernsey-registered music IP investment and song management company founded by Merck Mercuriadis and Nile Rodgers in 2018. Focused on songs and associated musical intellectual property rights, it was founded on the premise that hit songs are long-term predictable assets unaffected by economic cycles that will increase in value as the worldwide music streaming market grows. In addition to acquiring songs and songwriter catalogues, the company manages the playlist, cover, interpolation, and synchronization revenues of its IP.

Hipgnosis Songs Fund has raised £1.052 billion to fund acquisitions since it was established in 2018. At the close of its first full year as a publicly traded company, its catalogue contained more than 5,000 songs; of those approximately 2,000 had been #1 hits somewhere in the world, and 4,000 had reached the Top 10. Five songs that are co-owned by HSF appeared in the Top 10 on the Billboard Hot 100 of the decade chart.  In July 2020, it was reported that the Hipgnosis music rights portfolio, consisting of approximately 13,300 songs, had been independently valued at more than £760 million. As of January 2021, Hipgnosis owned or partially owned more than 57,000 songs. By December 2021, its catalogue had grown to 65,000 songs worth $2.55 billion.

Hipgnosis Songs Fund was listed on the main market of the London Stock Exchange in July 2018 and transferred to the premium segment of the main market in November 2019.  It has been a constituent of the FTSE 250 Index since March 2020.

History

2018: Founding, debut on London Stock Exchange
Hipgnosis Songs Fund was founded by Merck Mercuriadis, who has managed artists including Elton John, Iron Maiden, Morrissey, Beyoncé, and Nile Rodgers. Mercuriadis stated in a February 2019 interview:  "Nile [Rodgers] and I, one day, just started riffing off of these ideas of how do we change this system, how do we change what’s going on today where the songwriter–who provides the most important component in an artist having success–is the lowest person on the totem pole?"  Mercuriadis believed that a rights and song management company with substantial assets could change the existing economics of publishing for songwriters, and in 2018 building capital by offering investors pure-play exposure to songs and associated musical intellectual property rights in place,  HSF was formally founded. The company was named after Hipgnosis, the art and design group founded by Storm Thorgerson and Aubrey Powell. The Family (Music) Limited, an advisory board that included  Mercuriadis, Rodgers, Starrah, The-Dream, David A. Stewart, Nick Jarjour, Bill Leibowitz, and Ian Montone was established  in 2018. Rodney Jerkins joined the advisory board in July 2020.

Hipgnosis Songs Fund went public in July 2018; an earlier plan to float the company in the UK had been postponed to conduct further due diligence.  Its prospectus stated that there was a "unique market opportunity as technology disruption is changing the way music is consumed."  At its July 10, 2018 launch on the British Stock Exchange, HSF raised £202m, well over its goal. Trading as SONG, it was one of two investment trust IPOs that were oversubscribed that year. After it was listed the company reported that it had acquired a 75 percent interest in its first music rights catalog from musician The-Dream for £18.83 million. Among other hits, the 302-song collection included Justin Bieber's "Baby", Rihanna's "Umbrella" and Beyonce's "Single Ladies (Put a Ring on It)".

By the end of 2018, Hipgnosis acquired the Poo Bear catalogue of 214 songs, including Justin Bieber's "What Do You Mean?" and the English language version of "Despacito";  a 37.5% stake in Chic co-founder Bernard Edwards' catalogue,  which comprised 290 songs including "Everybody Dance", "Le Freak," "I Want Your Love" and "Good Times"; the 121-song catalogue of TMS, including "Don't Be So Hard On Yourself" for Jess Glynne, and "Wings" and "DNA" for Little Mix; and the 121-song catalogue of Tricky Stewart, who co-wrote many of The-Dream's hit songs, including "Me Against the Music" (by Britney Spears and Madonna), and Mariah Carey's "Touch My Body."

2019: Acquisitions, second and third raise, listing on LSE Premium segment
Prior to a second raise of £146.5 million in April 2019, Hipgnosis acquired the 182-song catalogue of Giorgio Tuinfort, including more than 15 UK Top 10 singles with David Guetta; Itaal Shur (209 songs, including "Smooth"), the 249-song catalogue of Johnta Austin, ("We Belong Together" by Mariah Carey, "Be Without You" by Mary J Blige); 588 songs by Sean Garrett, including "Yeah", Ciara's "Goodies, and "Check on It by Beyoncé; and the 245 song catalogue of Rico Love, including ""Without You" by David Guetta. In October 2019, the company acquired Timbaland's catalogue, which included all six albums by Missy Elliot, and the five Justin Timberlake albums that Timbaland produced. The catalogue comprises 108 albums and songs with collective sales in excess of 32 million. Five songs co-owned by Hipgnosis appeared in the Top 10 on Billboard's Hot 100 of the decade chart. (The Chainsmokers ft. Halsey's "Closer", "Uptown Funk" by Mark Ronson, "Shape of You" by Ed Sheeran, Maroon 5 ft. Cardi B, "Girls Like You", and "Despacito" by Luis Fonsi & Daddy Yankee ft. Justin Bieber). In December 2019, Hipgnosis added the first four studio albums by Kaiser Chiefs, and the songwriting catalogue of Jack Antonoff to its repertoire.

Hipgnosis raised  £49.9 million in August 2019, and an additional £233.7 million in October, bringing its "acquisition warchest" to nearly £650 million. As of October 2019, HSF holdings included more than 6000 songs, with hits from every decade since the 1950s, valued at £1.2 billion. In November 2019 the company was admitted to the London Stock Exchange Premium Segment of the Official List on the completion of four equity fundraises since its launch in June 2018.

2020: Acquisition of Kobalt Capital, Hipgnosis Songs Group, FTSE 250 Index
In January 2020, former blink-182 guitarist Tom DeLonge sold his publishing rights to Hipgnosis. In April 2020 the company acquired 70% of Mark Ronson's catalogue.

On 2 July 2020, to fund new investments to build a "pipeline of catalogs with an acquisition value of over £1bn," Hipgnosis announced that it sought to raise an additional £200 million through issuing a new tranche of class C shares. On July 7,  following the release of its FY2020 annual report—which disclosed that Hipgnosis had generated £65.661 million in revenue during its 2020 fiscal year—the company's market capitalisation hit an all-time high of nearly £1 billion.

Hipgnosis exceeded its July 2020 fundraising goal of £200 million after its new share placing was oversubscribed. The company raised £236.4 million, its largest equity raise, bringing Hipgnosis' total raise to more than £862 million. It subsequently acquired the catalogs of Jerkins, RedOne, and Barry Manilow, bringing its portfolio to approximately 13,300 songs.

In August 2020, Hipgnosis's market capitalisation exceeded £1 bn. In September 2020, the company acquired the American music publisher Big Deal Music, adding 4,400 copyrights to the company's portfolio. Big Deal was renamed Hipgnosis Songs Group. Later that month Hipgnosis announced that it would issue a new  tranche of ordinary shares to raise £190 million, stating that the capital would be used to acquire 50 catalogues that it had identified and exclusively secured. The target of £190 million was hit in 72 hours, bringing the fund's total raise to £1,052 bn, £392m of which was raised in two months.

Hipgnosis Songs Fund acquired 100% of the 162-song LA Reid catalogue in October 2020. Reid also joined the Hipgnosis advisory board.

In November 2020, Hipgnosis acquired 42 catalogues from Kobalt Music Group, comprising 1,500 songwriters and 33,000 songs, for $322.9 million. The acquired catalogues had been owned by Kobalt Capital's first fund, including Nettwerk, 50 Cent, Skrillex, The B-52s, Enrique Iglesias, and Steve Winwood. Kobalt, which is Hipgnosis' main publishing administrator, continued to represent these catalogues as well as the rest of Hipgnosis. Hipgnosis also bought a 50% stake in the publishing, neighbouring rights and recording catalogue of Rick James in November. In December 2020, HSF reached a £1.25b market cap.

2021-present: Valuation, Blackstone Group Investment
In January 2021, Jimmy Iovine sold his producer royalties to Hipgnosis, including 259 recordings and his movie production royalties for 8 Mile, which starred Eminem, and  50 Cent's Get Rich or Die Tryin'." Iovine stated that proceeds generated from the purchase would fund a new high school in Los Angeles as part of the USC Iovine and Young Academy. Hipgnosis also acquired the catalogue of Fleetwood Mac member Lindsey Buckingham, a 50% stake in the catalogue of Neil Young, all 145 of Shakira's songs, and 43 songs produced by Bob Rock. In March 2021, Hipgnosis acquired the catalogue of songwriter Carole Bayer Sager. In May 2021, Hipgnosis acquired the song catalogue of the Red Hot Chili Peppers (for its publishing business MoeBeToBlame Music) for a reported $140-$150 million. Hipgnosis also acquired the catalogue of songwriter Andrew Watt. In August 2021, Hipgnosis acquired the catalogue of Fleetwood Mac member Christine McVie. On 10 August 2020, Hipgnosis acquired 100% of Chris Cornell's catalog of song rights (241 songs), including his band Soundgarden's catalog.
Hipgnosis' annual report was published in July 2021, valuing the catalogue at $2.2 billion.

In October 2021 The Blackstone Group, an alternative investment management company, announced that it would partner with Mercuriadis to invest $1bn US to acquire song catalogues and music rights. It also announced that Blackstone would take an ownership stake in Hipgnosis Song Management.

In May 2022, Hipgnosis acquired 100% of the Justin Timberlake catalog, including the copyright, ownership, and financial interests of the writer's and publisher's share of public performance income. The worldwide administration rights to the compositions, subject to Timberlake's deal with Universal, expiring in 2025 were also acquired.

In July 2022, Hipgnosis signed an international sub-publishing deal with Peermusic. French performance rights society SACEM agreed to collect digital royalties for Hipgnosis in Europe.

In January 2023, Hipgnosis Songs Management acquired Justin Bieber's song catalogue.

Portfolio
The portfolio includes the following artists:

 10cc
 10,000 Maniacs
 50 Cent
 A.C. Newman
 Aaron Lee Tasjan
 Adolph Green
 Afghan Whigs
 Airbourne
 Al Jackson Jr.
 Alice Coltrane
 Amber Mark
 Ambrosia Parsley
 Ammar Malik
 Andre Williams
 Andrew "Roo" Panes
 Andrew Watt
 Andy Marvel
 Andy Wallace
 Ann Wilson
 Ari Levine
 Arnthor Birgisson
 Aryay (Owsla)
 The B-52s
 Banx & Ranx
 Barry Manilow
 Beach House
 Beggars Music Publishing
 Ben Goldsmith with Big Deal Music
 Benny Blanco
 Bernard Edwards
 Betty Comden
 Biffy Clyro
 Birds of Tokyo
 Birdy
 Black Stone Cherry
 Blake Mills
 Blondie
 Bob Rock
 Bobby Hebb
 Bonnie Baker
 Bonnie McKee
 Brad Tursi guitarist from Old Dominion
 Brendan O'Brien
 Brett Beavers
 Brian Higgins
 Brian Kennedy
 Cameron Avery
 Carole Bayer Sager
 Caroline Ailin
 Caroline Pennell
 Caroline Rose
 Charles Bradley
 Charly Bliss
 Chastity Brown
 Chelcee Grimes
 Chris Cornell
 Chrissie Hynde
 Christian Karlsson
 Christina Perri
 Christine McVie
 Chromeo
 Corin Tucker
 Craig Finn
 Cy Coleman
 Dan Wilson from Semisonic
 Daniele Luppi
 Danny Parker
 Dave Berg
 Dave Harrington
 Dave Sitek
 Dave Stewart
 David Zippel
 Dierks Bentley
 Diillon Francis
 Donna Missal
 Dorothy Fields
 Drive-By Truckers
 Ed Drewett
 Editors
 Eleanor Friedberger
 Eliot Kennedy
 Elliot Lurie
 Emile Haynie
 Enrique Iglesias
 Eric Bellinger
 Eric Stewart of 10cc
 Espionage
 Ethan Gruska of The Belle Brigade
 Ethan Johns
 Evan Bogart
 Explosions in the Sky
 Fidlar
 Flight of the Conchords
 Jenn Wasner aka Flock of Dimes
 Fraser T. Smith
 Fu Manchu
 Geese
 George Benson
 George Ducas
 George Thorogood
 Giorgio Tuinfort
 Greg Dulli
 Greg Wells
 Gus Seyffert formerly of The Black Keys
 Hannah Blaylock formerly of Edens Edge
 Happy Perez
 Hatchie
 Health
 Hippo Campus
 Ho99o9
 Hootie & the Blowfish
 Hop Along
 Ian Kirkpatrick
 Imad Royal
 Itaal Shur
 Ivor Raymonde
 Jack Antonoff
 Jade Jackson
 Jake Sinclair
 Jamie Scott
 Jason Ingram
 Jason White
 Jay Bellerose
 Jeff Bhasker
 Jenny Owen Youngs
 Jessie Baylin
 Jim James
 Jimmy Iovine
 Joe London
 Joel Little
 John Alagia
 John Coltrane
 John Doe
 John Fields
 John Martin Lindström
 John Newman
 John Rich of Big & Rich and formerly of Lonestar
 John Ryan
 John Spinks of The Outfield
 Johnny McDaid of Snow Patrol
 Johnta Austin
 Jon Bellion
 Jonathan Cain of Journey
 Jonny Coffer
 Josh Rouse
 Journey
 Julia Michaels
 Justin Bieber
 Justin Timberlake
 Kaiser Chiefs
 Kamasi Washington
 Kenny Chesney
 Kevin Godley
 Kim Cesarion
 Klas Åhlund of the Teddybears
 Kurtis McKenzie
 LA Reid
 Leonard Cohen
 Lindsay Buckingham
 Little Green Cars
 Local Natives
 Loren Humphrey of Guards
 Luciana Caporaso
 Lucy Dacus
 Lunchmoney Lewis
 Manchester Orchestra
 Mark Batson
 Mark Bryan
 Mark Ronson
 Martin Bresso
 MF Doom
 Michael Knox
 Mick Jenkins
 Mike Cooley
 Mike Daly
 Miranda Lee Richards
 Miriam Bryant
 Missy Higgins
 Molly Sarlé of Mountain Man
 My Morning Jacket
 Natalie Merchant
 Nate Ruess
 Native Tongues
 Neal Schon
 Neil Young
 Nelly
 Nick Lowe
 Nick Sylvester, formerly of Mr. Dream
 Nicole "Coco" Morier
 Nikki Sixx
 No I.D.
 Normani
 Nitti Gritti
 Okkervil River
 Ólafur Arnalds
 ONR. also known as Robert David Shields
 Patrick "Sleepy" Brown
 Patterson Hood of Drive-By Truckers
 Paul Barry
 Paul Butler of The Bees also known as  A Band of Bees
 Pavement
 Perfume Genius
 Pete Stewart
 Peter Matthew Bauer of The Walkmen
 Phoelix, a musician and a producer who has worked with Saba, Noname, and Smino.
 Picard Brothers
 Poo Bear also known as Jason Boyd
 Preservation Hall Jazz Band
 Pusha T also known as Terrence Thornton
 Pussy Riot
 Quicksand
 Ra Ra Riot
 Rainbow
 Ravi Coltrane
 Ray LaMontagne
 Red Hot Chili Peppers
 RedOne
 Rett Madison, producer who has worked with Theo Katzman
 Rhett Akins
 Richie Sambora
 Rick James
 Rico Love
 River Whyless
 Robin Hannibal
 Rock Mafia
 Rodney Jerkins aka Darkchild
 Rosanne Cash
 RZA
 Sacha Skarbeck
 Sam Hollander
 Sam Phillips
 Sara Watkins of Nickel Creek
 Sarah Jarosz
 Savan Kotecha
 Scott Cutler formerly of Ednaswap
 Scott Harris
 Sean Garrett
 Sean Watkins of Nickel Creek
 Shakira
 Shakey Graves
 Sharon Van Etten
 Shawn Camp
 Shungudzo also known as Alexandra Govere
 Sister Gertrude Morgan
 Skrillex
 St. Vincent
 Starrah
 Stefan Johnson of The Monsters & Strangerz
 Stephen Malkmus of Pavement and Stephen Malkmus and the Jicks
 Steve Robson
 Steve Winwood
 Steven Bernstein
 Stevie Hoang
 Sum 41
 Super Furry Animals
 Sylvan Esso
 Søren Juul
 Teddy Geiger
 The Black Angels
 The Cactus Blossoms
 The Chainsmokers
 The Contenders
 The Long Ryders
 The New Pornographers
 The Suicide Commandos
 The Walkmen
 The-Dream
 Third Day
 Thom Chacon, singer
 Thomas Brenneck
 Tift Merritt
 Tim Bruns formerly of Churchill
 Tim James of Rock Mafia
 Timbaland
 TMS
 Tobias Jesso Jr
 Tobias Wincorn, producer who worked with Timbaland  Meghan Trainor, Christina Aguilera, and other artists
 Tom DeLonge
 Tourist aka William Phillips
 Tricky Stewart
 Trivium
 Veruca Salt
 Vetiver
 Victor Rådström of Neiked
 Walter Afanasieff
 Walter Martin
 Weyes Blood also known as Natalie Mering
 Wolfmother
 Wombats
 Wye Oak
 X
 Young & Sick

References

External links
 

British companies established in 2018
Publishing companies established in 2018
Music publishing companies of the United Kingdom
Companies listed on the London Stock Exchange